Hylettus stigmosus is a species of longhorn beetles of the subfamily Lamiinae. It was described by Monné in 1982, and is known from southeastern Brazil.

References

Beetles described in 1982
Endemic fauna of Brazil
Hylettus